Integrated Geo Systems (IGS) is a computational architecture system developed for managing geoscientific data through systems and data integration.

Geosciences often involve large volumes of diverse data which have to be processed by computer and graphics intensive applications. The processes involved in processing these large datasets are often so complex that no single applications software can perform all the required tasks. Specialized applications have emerged for specific tasks. To get the required results, it is necessary that all applications software involved in various stages of data processing, analysis and interpretation effectively communicate with each other by sharing data.

IGS provides a framework for maintaining an electronic workflow between various geoscience software applications through data connectivity.

The main components of IGS are:

 Geographic information systems as a front end. 
 Format engine for data connectivity link between various geoscience software applications. The format engine uses Output Input Language (OIL), an interpreted language, to define various data formats.
 An array of geoscience relational databases for data integration.
 Data highways as internal data formats for each data type.
 Specialized geoscience applications software as processing modules.
 Geoscientific processing libraries

External links 
 Geological Society Books
 American Association of Petroleum Geologists Book Store
 Integrated Geo Systems Research Paper

Computer systems